The Missing Person is a 2009 American drama-mystery film written and directed by American independent filmmaker Noah Buschel and starring Michael Shannon and Amy Ryan. It premiered at the 2009 Sundance Film Festival. and was distributed by Strand Releasing to a limited number of theaters on November 20, 2009.

Plot summary
John Rosow (Michael Shannon) is an alcoholic private investigator. Suddenly Rosow is given the case of his life when he is hired to tail a man named Harold Fullmer (Frank Wood) on a train. Rosow soon discovers that Fullmer is one of the thousands presumed missing after 9/11, and that Fullmer has fashioned a new life for himself. As the film progresses, Rosow faces the moral decision to take Fullmer, unwilling, back to his wife in New York, or letting him remain in his fabricated life.

Cast
 Michael Shannon as John Rosow
 Frank Wood as Harold Fullmer
 Amy Ryan as Miss Charley
 Linda Emond as Megan Fullmer
 Paul Sparks as Gus
 Margaret Colin as Lana Cobb
 Paul Adelstein as Drexler Hewitt

Reception and release
The film holds a 67% positive rating on the film-critics aggregator Rotten Tomatoes. Buschel was nominated for the 2009 Gotham Award for Best Breakthrough Director for his work on the film. According to Box Office Mojo, the film  had grossed $48,895 as of March 2, 2010. It appeared on IFC.com's list of the ten best films of 2009, San Francisco Bay Guardian's list of the Top Three Films of 2009, and Variety critic Dennis Harvey's list of the Top 25 films of the year.

References

External links
 
 Michael Shannon On Strand Releasing's Failure To Promote
 Michael Shannon Missing Person Interview
 IFC Alison Willmore Michael Shannon Interview
 Tribeca Film on The Missing Person 

2009 films
American mystery films
2000s English-language films
Films about missing people
Films based on the September 11 attacks
2000s mystery films
Films directed by Noah Buschel
2000s American films